Allen James Wilcox is an American epidemiologist who heads the reproductive epidemiology group at the National Institute of Environmental Health Sciences (NIEHS).

Education
Wilcox received his BA degree from the University of Michigan in 1968 and his MD from the University of Michigan Health System in 1973. He later received both his MPH and PhD from the UNC Gillings School of Global Public Health (formerly known as the University of North Carolina at Chapel Hill School of Public Health) in 1976 and 1979, respectively.

Career
Wilcox began working at the NIEHS in 1979, where he helped establish their epidemiology branch and served as its chief from 1991 to 2001. He became a senior investigator at the NIEHS's epidemiology branch in 2001.

Research
Wilcox's research falls into three categories: fertility and pregnancy, the use of birth weight and preterm delivery in perinatal research, and fetal development and child health. In 1988, he published a study that found that 31% of pregnancies ended in miscarriages, and in 1994, he published a study that found a strong link between the environment in which people live and work and the risk of birth defects in their children. In 1995, he published a study that found that women had the best chance of conceiving a child if they had sex on the day of ovulation, with the odds of conception falling sharply thereafter. The same study found that the period during which women had the highest chance of conceiving lasted six days, including the five days before ovulation and the day of the ovulation itself.

Honors, awards and positions
Wilcox has served as the president of the American Epidemiological Society, the Society for Pediatric and Perinatal Epidemiologic Research, and the Society for Epidemiologic Research. He received an honorary Ph.D. from the University of Bergen in 2008.

Editorial activities
Wilcox has been the editor-in-chief of the peer-reviewed journal Epidemiology since 2001.

References

External links

American public health doctors
Living people
Medical journal editors
National Institutes of Health people
Place of birth missing (living people)
University of Michigan Medical School alumni
UNC Gillings School of Global Public Health alumni
Year of birth missing (living people)